The Egyptian Revolution of 1919 ( Thawra 1919) was a countrywide revolution against the British occupation of Egypt and Sudan. It was carried out by Egyptians from different walks of life in the wake of the British-ordered exile of the revolutionary Egyptian Nationalist leader Saad Zaghlul, and other members of the Wafd Party in 1919.

The revolution led to the United Kingdom's later recognition of Egyptian independence in 1922 as the Kingdom of Egypt, and the implementation of a new constitution in 1923. The British government, however, refused to recognise full Egyptian sovereignty over Sudan, or to withdraw its forces from the Suez Canal Zone, factors that would continue to sour Anglo-Egyptian relations in the decades leading up to the Egyptian revolution of 1952.

Background
The Ottoman Empire retained nominal sovereignty over Egypt, but the political connection between the two countries was largely severed by the earlier seizure of power by Muhammad Ali in 1805, and re-enforced by the later increasing British influence and occupation of Egypt in 1882. From 1883 to 1914, the Khedive of Egypt and Sudan under the Ottoman Sultan remained the official ruler of the country, but ultimate power was exercised by the British Consul-General.

When the Caucasus Campaign of World War I broke out between the Russian Empire and the Ottoman Empire, Britain declared martial law in Egypt, and announced that it would shoulder the entire burden of the war. On 14 December 1914, the Khedivate of Egypt was elevated to a separate level of Sultanate of Egypt, and declared as a British protectorate, thus terminating definitively the legal fiction of Ottoman sovereignty over its province of Egypt. The terms of the protectorate led Egyptian nationalists to believe that it was a temporary arrangement that would be changed after the world war through bilateral agreement with Britain.

Causes
Before World War I, nationalist agitation was limited to the educated elite. 

During the war, however, dissatisfaction with the British occupation spread among all classes of the population, a result of Egypt's increasing involvement in the war despite Britain's promise to shoulder the entire burden. 

During the war, the British government stationed thousands of imperial troops in Egypt, conscripted over one and a half million Egyptians into the Labour Corps, and requisitioned buildings, supplies and animals fight on different fronts for use in the war effort. In addition, because of Allied promises during the war (such as American President Woodrow Wilson's "Fourteen Points"), Egyptian political classes prepared for self-government. By war's end, the Egyptian people demanded their independence.

Events
Shortly after the First World War armistice on 11 November was concluded on the Western Front in Europe, a delegation of Egyptian nationalist activists led by Saad Zaghlul made a request to High Commissioner Reginald Wingate to end the British Protectorate in Egypt and Sudan, and gain Egyptian representation at the planned peace conference in Paris. The delegation also included 'Ali Sha'rawi Pasha, Abd al-Aziz Fahmi Bey, Muhammad 'Ali Bey, 'Abd al-Latif al-Makabati Bey, Muhammad Mahmud Pasha, Sinut Hanna Bey, Hamd Pasha al-Basil, George Khayyat Bey, Mahmud Abu al-Nasr Bey, Mustafa al-Nahhas Bey and Dr. Hafiz 'Afifi Bey.

Meanwhile, a mass movement for the full independence of Egypt and Sudan was being organised at a grassroots level, using the tactics of civil disobedience. By then, Zaghlul and the Wafd Party enjoyed massive support among the Egyptian people. Wafdist emissaries went into towns and villages to collect signatures authorizing the movement's leaders to petition for the complete independence of the country.

Seeing the popular support that the Wafd leaders enjoyed, and fearing social unrest, the British administration proceeded to arrest Zaghlul on 8 March 1919 and exiled him with two other movement leaders to Malta. In the course of widespread disturbances between 15 and 31 March, at least 800 people were killed, numerous villages were burnt down, large landed properties plundered and railways destroyed by angered Egyptian mobs. "The result [of the arrest] was revolution," according to noted professor of Egyptian history, James Jankowski.

For several weeks until April, demonstrations and strikes across Egypt by students, elite, civil servants, merchants, peasants, workers, and religious leaders became such a daily occurrence that normal life was brought to a halt. This mass movement was characterised by the participation of both men and women, and by spanning the religious divide between Muslim and Christian Egyptians. The uprising in the Egyptian countryside was more violent, involving attacks on British military installations, civilian facilities and personnel. The Egyptian Expeditionary Force, the British army in the region, engaged in mass repression to restore order.  The initial response to the revolution was by the Egyptian police force in Cairo, although control was handed off to Major-General H.D.Watson and his military forces in the city within a few days. By 25 July 1919, 800 Egyptians were dead, and 1,600 others were wounded. 

The British government under Prime Minister David Lloyd George, sent a commission of inquiry, known as the "Milner Mission", to Egypt in December 1919, to determine the causes of the disorder, and to make a recommendation about the political future of the country. Lord Milner's report to Lloyd George, the Cabinet and King George V, published in February 1921, recommended that the protectorate status of Egypt was not satisfactory and should be abandoned. The revolts forced London to later issue a unilateral declaration of Egyptian independence on 28 February 1922.

Aftermath
The British government offered to recognize Egypt as an independent sovereign state, but with the British government holding on to these powers: the security of the communications of the British Empire in Egypt; defending Egypt against foreign aggression; and protecting foreign interests in Egypt and the Sudan.

The Wafd Party drafted a new constitution in 1923 based on a parliamentary representative system. Egyptian independence at this stage was nominal, as British forces continued to be physically present on Egyptian soil. Moreover, Britain's recognition of Egyptian independence directly excluded Sudan, which continued to be administered as an Anglo-Egyptian condominium. Saad Zaghlul became the first popularly elected Prime Minister of Egypt in 1924.

See also

 Egyptian revolution of 1952
 2011 Egyptian revolution
 History of modern Egypt
 Mustafa Kamil Pasha
 Egyptian nationalism
 List of modern conflicts in the Middle East
 1935–1936 protests in Egypt
 1968 protests in Egypt
 2000 uprising in Egypt

Notes

Further reading
 
 
 
 
 
 
 
 
 

 
1918 in Egypt
1919 in Egypt
20th-century revolutions
Conflicts in 1919
Egyptian nationalism
History of Egypt (1900–present)
Nonviolent revolutions
Protests in Egypt
Revolutions in Egypt